The phrase grotesque, unbelievable, bizarre and unprecedented was paraphrased from a comment by then Taoiseach Charles Haughey, while describing a strange series of incidents in the summer of 1982 that led to a double-murderer, Malcolm MacArthur, being apprehended in the home of the Irish Attorney General Patrick Connolly.

The corresponding acronym, GUBU, was coined by Conor Cruise O'Brien, and both it and the phrase are still occasionally used in Irish political discourse to describe notorious scandals. In January 2011 some ministerial resignations from the Government were described by its opponent Michael Noonan as "... bizarre, grotesque and to some extent unbelievable."

Background
The murderer, Malcolm Edward MacArthur, born 17 April 1945, was a well-known eccentric character in Dublin social circles and never held a job, as he lived off his inheritance from the sale of his father's farm, after his death in 1974. However, as his money ran out, MacArthur decided to fund his lifestyle by robbery. First he decided to purchase a gun and responded to an advertisement by Dónal Dunne, a farmer in Edenderry, County Offaly, who had a shotgun for sale. However, having no transport and needing to get from Dublin to Edenderry, he decided to steal a car.

On 22 July 1982, a nurse named Bridie Gargan (aged 27) had been sunbathing in the Phoenix Park in Dublin during her time off work. MacArthur, intending to steal her car, bludgeoned her with a hammer. In the ensuing confusion, MacArthur drove off, leaving the dying Gargan on the back seat.

At this point a passing ambulance became involved and escorted MacArthur to the hospital, as the driver mistook him for a doctor because of a windscreen sticker which Gargan had. MacArthur later abandoned the car nearby. Three days later, having found alternative means to get to Edenderry, MacArthur visited the farmer Dónal Dunne and murdered him with his own shotgun after examining it. MacArthur then stole Dunne's car and drove it to Dublin. These two violent murders created a sensation, as unmotivated murder in Ireland, coupled with the youth and respectability of the nurse and farmer, was an unusual set of circumstances.

The Garda Síochána (Irish police) soon had a description of the person they wanted.

Fallout
MacArthur was acquainted with Patrick Connolly, the then Attorney General, who was the chief legal advisor to the Irish Government. On 13 August 1982, after a massive search, MacArthur was arrested on the private property of Connolly, where he had been staying for some time as a guest. Connolly, who had been getting ready for holiday, continued on his journey to the United States and did not give any interview to the Gardaí on the matter.

A serious effort was made to prevent the relationship between Connolly and MacArthur becoming public and indeed it was claimed that this was homosexual, something that was later discounted. Connolly was promptly requested to return to Ireland where he then resigned on 16 August. Haughey attempted to distance himself from the fiasco and described the event as "a bizarre happening, an unprecedented situation, a grotesque situation, an almost unbelievable mischance."

MacArthur admitted his guilt of the murder of the nurse. Because of this, he was not tried for Dunne's murder as the state entered a plea of nolle prosequi. This led to a petition of 10,000 signatures to ensure MacArthur would be tried for his murder. This was unsuccessful and MacArthur received a life sentence for just one murder.

After conviction
In 2003 the parole board recommended that MacArthur be put on a temporary release programme which would eventually lead to his release. Michael McDowell, the then Minister for Justice, who was also a member of MacArthur's defence team in the murder trial, decided that he would take no part in the decision for fear of a conflict of interest.

In July 2004 it was decided to keep MacArthur in prison, as relatives – including his mother – considered him dangerous.

MacArthur was allowed to spend Christmas Day 2005 with a relative outside prison and was also allowed a five-hour Christmas parole in 2006.

MacArthur was released from Shelton Abbey Prison on 17 September 2012.

In popular culture
MacArthur's story inspired John Banville's 1989 novel, The Book of Evidence.

GUBU was also the name of a bar on Capel Street in Dublin in the early part of the 2000s.

References

External links
McArthur's bizarre courtroom chat with detectives
BBC World Update entry explaining the term
Irish Parliamentary Debates — usage of the term "GUBU" in Dáil and Seanad debates
Dictionary definition of GUBU — includes citations

Acronyms
Charles Haughey
History of the Republic of Ireland
Political scandals in the Republic of Ireland
Politics of the Republic of Ireland
1980s neologisms